Nivelles is a railway station in the town of Nivelles, Walloon Brabant, Belgium. The station opened on 1 June 1874 and is located on line 124. The train services are operated by National Railway Company of Belgium (NMBS).

The station used to be known as Nivelles East when there was also a Nivelles North station on the former line 141.

The railway line between Nivelles-Waterloo-Linkebeek (south of Brussels) is currently (2015) being enlarged to allow a higher frequency of local and intercity trains.

Train services
The station is served by the following services:

Intercity services (IC-05) Antwerp - Mechelen - Brussels - Nivelles - Charleroi (weekdays)
Intercity services (IC-27) Brussls Airport - Brussels-Luxembourg - Etterbeek - Nivelles - Charleroi (weekdays)
Intercity services (IC-31) Antwerp - Mechelen - Brussels - Nivelles - Charleroi (weekends)
Brussels RER services (S1) Antwerp - Mechelen - Brussels - Waterloo - Nivelles (weekdays)
Brussels RER services (S1) Brussels - Waterloo - Nivelles (weekends)
Brussels RER services (S9) Landen - Brussels-Luxembourg - Nivelles (weekdays)

See also
 List of railway stations in Belgium

References

Railway stations in Belgium
Railway stations opened in 1874
Railway stations in Walloon Brabant